Susana Urbina (born 1946) is a Peruvian-American psychologist. She received her Ph.D. in Psychometrics from Fordham University in 1972 and was licensed in Florida in 1976. She currently teaches at University of North Florida, where her principal areas of teaching and research are psychological testing and assessment.

Urbina is a fellow of Division 5 (Evaluation, Measurement, and Statistics) of the American Psychological Association (APA) and of the Society for Personality Assessment. She has chaired the Committee on Psychological Tests and Assessment and the Committee on Professional Practice and Standards of the APA. In 1995, Urbina was part of an 11-member APA task force led by Ulric Neisser which published "Intelligence: Knowns and Unknowns," a report written in response to The Bell Curve.

Publications
Urbina S. Psychological Testing: Seventh Edition, Study Guide. Macmillan Pub Co; 6th edition (June 1, 1989) 
Urbina S. Psychological Testing: Study Guide. Prentice Hall; 7th edition (September 1, 1997) 

Urbina S. (2014) Essentials of Psychological Testing. Wiley; 2nd edition

External links
Susana Urbina website via University of North Florida

American women psychologists
21st-century American psychologists
Fordham University alumni
People from Jacksonville, Florida
University of North Florida faculty
Place of birth missing (living people)
1946 births
Living people
American women academics
21st-century American women
20th-century American psychologists
Quantitative psychologists